The Tunisian Women's Handball Cup or in ( Arabic language : كأس تونس لكرة اليد للسيدات ) is a Tunisian women's handball competition held every year since its inception in 1964, it is Ruled by The Tunisian Handball Federation.
Club Africain is the dominant club with more than 27 Cups record 12 of them are consecutive, Followed by ASF Sahel by 10 Cups and in third rank we find ASE Ariana by 4 Cups, However The Cup winners will Qualify directly to the Cup Winners' Cup.

Winners list

Most successful clubs 

 Notes: : ASF Sahel old name was Zaoui Meubles Sports

See also 
Tunisian Handball League
Tunisian Handball Cup
Tunisian Women's Handball League

References

External links 
  Tunisia Handball INFO 
 Tunisian Women's Handball Cup INFO 

Handball in Tunisia
1965 establishments in Africa